Nicholas III of Opava (– 9 July 1394) was Duke of Opava from 1367 to 1377 and Duke of Głubczyce from 1377 until his death.

Life 
Nicholas II of Opava was a member of the Opava branch of the Přemyslid dynasty.  His parents were Duke Nicholas II of Opava and his second wife, Hedwig (died 1359), a daughter of Duke Konrad I of Oleśnica.

After their father's death in 1365, Nicholas III and his three brothers initially ruled their inheritance jointly.  In 1367, however, the inheritance was divided: the oldest brother, John I, received the Duchy of Racibórz, while the three younger brothers, Nicholas III, Wenceslaus I and Przemko I continued to jointly rule the Duchy of Opava.  In 1377, Opava was split, with Nicholas III and Wenceslaus I jointly ruling the newly split off Duchy of Głubczyce and Přemek I ruling what remained of the Duchy of Opava.

As Nicholas III was continually in financial difficulties, he had to mortgage the districts of Głubczyce, Zlate Hory, Hlučín and Krzanowice to his uncle Conrad II of Oels.

Nicholas III died unmarried and childless in 1394.   His youngest brother Přemysl I continued to rule the Duchy of Głubczyce.  He succeeded in redeeming the district of Głubczyce.

References 
 Ludwig Petry et al.: Geschichte Schlesiens, vol. 1, Sigmaringen, 1988, pp. 171 and 184.
 Hugo Weczerka (ed.): Handbuch der historischen Stätten: Schlesien, Stuttgart, 1977, genealogical tables on pages 600 and 601.

External links 
 

Moravian nobility
Opavian Přemyslids
14th-century births
Year of birth uncertain
1394 deaths
Dukes of Silesia